Ananda Group is a Bangladeshi business conglomerate. The first Ananda company was established in 1983 as the Ananda Builders. The diverse business areas of the group include ship building, heavy engineering, textiles, real estate and shipping.

The most well-known concern under the group is Ananda Shipyard & Slipways Limited. It is the largest of the private ship yards in Bangladesh.

List of companies
 Ananda Shipyard & Slipways Limited  
 Zarina Composite Textile Industries 
 Ananda Bag Mill
 Ananda Builders
 Ananda ICT
 Ananda El-Dorado
 Ananda International 
 Ananda Shipping Lines

External links
 
 Website of Ananda Shipyard & Slipways Ltd

Companies based in Dhaka
Conglomerate companies of Bangladesh
Real estate companies of Bangladesh
Manufacturing companies based in Dhaka